The Gelendzhik Bay is an ice-free bay located on the Russian coast of the Black Sea, immediately to the southeast of the Tsemes Bay. The entire 12-km coastline between the capes Tonkiy and Tolstyi falls within the boundaries of Gelendzhik. Beaches take up about two thirds of shoreline. Further inland rise the low Markotkh mountains. The maximum depth of the sea is 11 meters.

Bays of the Black Sea
Bays of Krasnodar Krai